Karoline Friederike von Berg (1760–1826), was a German salonist and lady in waiting. She was the confidant of the Prussian queen Louise of Mecklenburg-Strelitz.

References
 Urte von Berg: Caroline Friederike von Berg - Freundin der Königin Luise von Preußen. Ein Portrait nach Briefen, Wallstein, Göttingen 2008

1760 births
1826 deaths
German ladies-in-waiting
German salon-holders